Holman is an unincorporated community in southeastern Fayette County, Texas, United States. Holman has a population of approximately 100 people. It lies 15 miles southeast of La Grange, Texas.

External links
 HOLMAN, TX Handbook of Texas Online.

Unincorporated communities in Fayette County, Texas
Unincorporated communities in Texas